The Lochore Cup is a New Zealand rugby union trophy named after famed Wairarapa Bush and All Blacks player and coach Brian Lochore. It is contested during the Heartland Championship. It was first awarded in 2006, when the Heartland Championship format was introduced.

Competition

Regular season
At present, all 12 teams play 8 games over 8 weeks before the finals. Once finished, the teams placed 5-8 advance to the Lochore Cup finals. The top 4 teams play for the Meads Cup. Previously, a pool system was used between 2006 and 2010 to determine who played for the Cups.

Finals
The Lochore Cup winner is determined in four-team single-elimination tournament. The semifinal matchups are seeded 1-4 and 2-3, with the higher seed receiving home field advantage. The highest remaining seed hosts the Lochore Cup final.

Winners

See also
 Meads Cup
 Heartland Championship
 New Zealand Heartland XV
 National Provincial Championship (1976–2005)
 National Provincial Championship (2006–present)

References

Heartland Championship
Rugby union trophies and awards
New Zealand sports trophies and awards